Ndolé is a Cameroonian dish consisting of stewed nuts, ndoleh (bitter leaves indigenous to West Africa), and fish or beef.

The dish may also contain shrimp. It is traditionally eaten with plantains, bobolo (a Cameroonian dish made of fermented ground manioc or cassava and wrapped in leaves), etc.

Gallery

See also
 Cuisine of Cameroon
 National dish
 List of African dishes
 List of stews

References

Cameroonian cuisine
National dishes
Stews